Arthur Pearson may refer to:
 Arthur Pearson (British politician) (1897–1980), British Labour Party Member of Parliament for Pontypridd, 1938–1970
 Sir Arthur Pearson, 1st Baronet (1866–1921), British newspaper magnate and publisher
 Arthur Maurice Pearson (1890–1976), Canadian Senator from Saskatchewan
 Arthur Pearson (footballer) (1896–1963), Australian footballer
 Arthur Anselm Pearson (1874–1954), English mycologist
 Arthur MacDonald Pearson (born 1936), political figure in the Yukon, Canada